East Tennessee and Western North Carolina Railroad Locomotive No. 12, also known as Tweetsie Locomotive No. 12, is a narrow-gauge 4-6-0 "Ten Wheeler" type steam locomotive located near Blowing Rock, Watauga County, North Carolina.

History
The engine was built in 1917 by the Baldwin Locomotive Works for the East Tennessee and Western North Carolina Railroad. After retirement in 1949, the East Tennessee and Western North Carolina Railroad ceased operations in 1950 and No. 12 is the only one of the railroad's narrow-gauge engines still in existence. It was sold to the Shenandoah Central in 1952 were it was restored in 1953 and continued to operate in service until its second retirement in 1954. The locomotive was put up for sale again and was later sold to the Tweetsie Railroad theme park in 1957 were it received a full restoration and began pulling excursion trains around the park on July 4, 1957. Today, No. 12 continues to operate at the Tweetsie Railroad along with former White Pass and Yukon Route 2-8-2 No. 190.

It was listed on the National Register of Historic Places in 1992.

References

Individual locomotives of the United States
Railway locomotives on the National Register of Historic Places
Buildings and structures completed in 1917
Buildings and structures in Watauga County, North Carolina
National Register of Historic Places in Watauga County, North Carolina
Rail infrastructure on the National Register of Historic Places in North Carolina
Preserved steam locomotives of North Carolina